P. G. Rajendran is an Indian politician and incumbent Member of the Legislative Assembly from Alangulam constituency. He was previously elected to the Tamil Nadu legislative assembly as an Anna Dravida Munnetra Kazhagam candidate from the same Alangulam constituency in 2001 election.

He is called as PGR with the known people. He is from village called Thayarthoppu (near Surandai) from Tirunelveli District. He contested for Assembly twice in Alangulam and won on both occasions, first time -2001 defeated Aladi Aruna (former law minister), second time-2011 defeated Pongathai (former IT minister as well daughter of Aladi Aruna).

Electoral performance

References 

All India Anna Dravida Munnetra Kazhagam politicians
Living people
Date of birth missing (living people)
Year of birth missing (living people)